Víctor Capacho (born 22 February 1968) is a Colombian wrestler. He competed in the men's Greco-Roman 48 kg at the 1988 Summer Olympics.

References

1968 births
Living people
Colombian male sport wrestlers
Olympic wrestlers of Colombia
Wrestlers at the 1988 Summer Olympics
Place of birth missing (living people)
Pan American Games medalists in wrestling
Pan American Games silver medalists for Colombia
Wrestlers at the 1987 Pan American Games
Wrestlers at the 1991 Pan American Games
Medalists at the 1991 Pan American Games
20th-century Colombian people